Adelaide of Forcalquier (11th-century - after 1129) was a suo jure reigning countess of Forcalquier from 1110 to 1129. 

She was the daughter of William Bertrand of Provence. She married Ermengol IV, Count of Urgell.

References

Counts of Forcalquier

11th-century births
Year of birth unknown

12th-century deaths

Year of death unknown
11th-century women rulers
12th-century women rulers
11th-century French people
11th-century French women
12th-century French people
12th-century French women